The Drake Case is a 1929 American pre-Code mystery film directed by Edward Laemmle and written by J.G. Hawks, Charles Logue and Dudley Early. The film stars Gladys Brockwell, Forrest Stanley, Robert Frazer, and Doris Lloyd. The film was released on September 1, 1929, by Universal Pictures.

Cast        
Gladys Brockwell as Lulu Marks
Forrest Stanley as District Attorney
Robert Frazer as Roger Lane
James Crane as Hugo Jepson
Barbara Leonard as Mrs. Drake 
Doris Lloyd as Georgia 
William L. Thorne as Captain Condon
Guy Edward Hearn as Edmonds 
Tom Dugan as Bill

References

External links
 

1929 films
American mystery films
1929 mystery films
Universal Pictures films
Films directed by Edward Laemmle
American black-and-white films
1920s English-language films
1920s American films